Avatha macrostidsa is a species of moth of the family Erebidae. It is found on New Guinea.

References

Moths described in 1913
Avatha
Moths of New Guinea